

Destinations in 1931 

In 1931, Braniff Airways was serving just five destinations:

 Chicago, Illinois
 Kansas City, Kansas
 Oklahoma City, Oklahoma
 Tulsa, Oklahoma
 Wichita Falls, Texas

According to the March 10, 1931 Braniff Airways system timetable, flights were operated on a linear routing of Chicago-Kansas City-Tulsa-Oklahoma City-Wichita Falls at this time.

Destinations in 1948 

In June 1948, the airline was flying both domestic and international service and had changed its name to Braniff International Airways.  According to its June 4, 1948 system timetable, the following destinations were being served:

 Amarillo, Texas
 Austin, Texas
 Brownsville, Texas
 Burlington, Iowa
 Chicago, Illinois
 Colorado Springs, Colorado
 Corpus Christi, Texas
 Dallas, Texas
 Denver, Colorado
 Fort Smith, Arkansas
 Fort Worth, Texas
 Galveston, Texas
 Guayaquil, Ecuador
 Havana, Cuba
 Houston, Texas
 Kansas City, Missouri
 Laredo, Texas
 Lima, Peru
 Little Rock, Arkansas
 Lubbock, Texas
 Memphis, Tennessee
 Moline, Illinois
 Muskogee, Oklahoma
 Oklahoma City, Oklahoma
 Panama City, Panama (via Balboa, Canal Zone)
 Ponca City, Oklahoma
 Pueblo, Colorado
 San Antonio, Texas
 Topeka, Kansas
 Tulsa, Oklahoma
 Waco, Texas
 Wichita Falls, Texas
 Wichita, Kansas

According to the above referenced Braniff International timetable, flights were operated with Douglas DC-3, DC-4 and DC-6 aircraft at this time.  Braniff's new international service was being operated on a routing of Chicago-Kansas City-Dallas-Houston-Havana-Balboa, C.Z.-Guayaquil-Lima twice a week with an additional service being flown once a week on a routing of Chicago-Kansas City-Dallas-Houston-Havana-Balboa, C.Z.-Lima.

Merger with Mid-Continent Airlines:  New destinations in the 1950s 

Following its acquisition of and merger with Mid-Continent Airlines in 1952, Braniff began serving the following new destinations:

 Aberdeen, South Dakota
 Bismarck, North Dakota
 Clinton, Iowa
 Des Moines, Iowa
 Dubuque, Iowa
 Fort Dodge, Iowa
 Huron, South Dakota
 Joplin, Missouri
 Lincoln, Nebraska
 Longview, Texas
 Mason City, Iowa
 Milwaukee, Wisconsin
 Minneapolis/St. Paul, Minnesota
 Minot, North Dakota
 Mitchell, South Dakota
 New Orleans, Louisiana
 Norfolk, Nebraska
 Omaha, Nebraska
 Ottumwa, Iowa
 Quincy, Illinois
 Rochester, Minnesota
 Rockford, Illinois
 St. Joseph, Missouri
 St. Louis, Missouri
 Shreveport, Louisiana
 Sioux City, Iowa
 Sioux Falls, South Dakota
 Texarkana, Arkansas
 Tyler, Texas
 Waterloo, Iowa
 Watertown, South Dakota

Braniff also began serving Austin, Minnesota; Brookings, South Dakota; Fargo, North Dakota and McAlester, Oklahoma during the 1950s:

The acquisition of Mid-Continent by Braniff enabled the airline to begin service for the first time to several large U.S. cities including Milwaukee, Minneapolis/St. Paul, New Orleans, Omaha and St. Louis.  However, by 1960 Braniff had ceased serving many of the smaller cities listed above.

Destinations:  1960-1982 

The following destinations were served by Braniff International Airways primarily with jet aircraft (except where noted below) during the 1960s, 1970s and early 1980s before it ceased operations in May 1982. According to various Braniff timetables and route maps, a number of these destinations were served at different times over the years.

Acapulco (General Juan N. Álvarez International Airport)
Albany, NY (Albany International Airport)
Amarillo (Amarillo International Airport)
Amsterdam (Amsterdam Airport Schiphol)
Anchorage (Anchorage International Airport) - served by Alaska Airlines via interchange flights operated in conjunction with Braniff 
 Antofagasta (Cerro Moreno International Airport)
Asunción (Silvio Pettirossi International Airport)
Atlanta (Hartsfield-Jackson Atlanta International Airport)
Austin (Robert Mueller Airport)
Balboa, Canal Zone - served via Tocumen International Airport
Birmingham (Birmingham-Shuttlesworth International Airport)
Bogotá (El Dorado International Airport)
Boston (Logan International Airport) - hub 
Brownsville (Brownsville/South Padre Island International Airport)
Brussels (Brussels Airport)
Buenos Aires (Ministro Pistarini International Airport)
Calgary (Calgary International Airport) - served by Western Airlines via interchange flights operated in conjunction with Braniff
Cali (Alfonso Bonilla Aragón International Airport)
Caracas (Simón Bolívar International Airport)
Chattanooga (Chattanooga Metropolitan Airport) - mainline prop aircraft service until the early 1960s
Chicago 
(Midway International Airport) - mainline prop aircraft service until the early 1960s
(O'Hare International Airport)
Cleveland (Hopkins International Airport)
Colorado Springs (Colorado Springs Airport)
Corpus Christi (Corpus Christi International Airport)
Dallas – Fort Worth Metroplex (Dallas/Fort Worth International Airport) - primary hub
Dallas (Love Field Airport) - former hub
Denver (Stapleton International Airport)
Des Moines (Des Moines International Airport)
Detroit (Detroit Metropolitan Wayne County Airport)
Edmonton (Edmonton International Airport) - served by Western Airlines via interchange flights operated in conjunction with Braniff
Fairbanks (Fairbanks International Airport) - served by Alaska Airlines via interchange flights operated in conjunction with Braniff
Fort Lauderdale (Fort Lauderdale-Hollywood International Airport)
 Fort Smith, AR (Fort Smith Regional Airport)
 Fort Worth (Greater Southwest International Airport)
Frankfurt (Frankfurt Airport)
Guam (Guam International Airport)
Guayaquil (José Joaquín de Olmedo International Airport)
Harlingen, TX (Valley International Airport)
Hartford, CT/Springfield, MA (Bradley International Airport)
Hilo (Hilo International Airport)
Hong Kong (Kai Tak Airport)
Honolulu (Honolulu International Airport)
Houston (George Bush Intercontinental Airport) - hub
Houston (William P. Hobby Airport)
Jacksonville (Jacksonville International Airport)
Kansas City (Kansas City International Airport)
La Paz (El Alto International Airport)
Las Vegas (McCarran International Airport)
 Little Rock (Little Rock National Airport)
Los Angeles (Los Angeles International Airport) - hub
Lima (Jorge Chávez International Airport)
London (Gatwick Airport)
Lubbock (Lubbock International Airport)
Manaus (Eduardo Gomes International Airport)
Maracaibo (La Chinita International Airport)
Memphis (Memphis International Airport)
Mexico City (Mexico City International Airport)
Miami (Miami International Airport) (hub)
Midland, TX/Odessa, TX (Midland International Airport)
Milwaukee (General Mitchell International Airport)
Minneapolis/Saint Paul (Minneapolis-Saint Paul International Airport)
Montevideo (Carrasco International Airport)
Montreal (Montréal–Pierre Elliott Trudeau International Airport)
Nashville (Nashville International Airport)
New Orleans (New Orleans International Airport)
New York City
(John F. Kennedy International Airport)
(LaGuardia Airport)
Newark (Newark International Airport)
Oakland (Oakland International Airport)
Oklahoma City (Will Rogers World Airport)
Omaha (Eppley Airfield)
Orlando (Orlando International Airport)
Panama City - (Tocumen International Airport) 
Paris (Charles de Gaulle Airport)
Philadelphia (Philadelphia International Airport)
Phoenix (Sky Harbor International Airport)
Pittsburgh (Pittsburgh International Airport)
Portland (Portland International Airport)
Quito (Mariscal Sucre Airport)
Reno (Reno-Tahoe International Airport)
Rio de Janeiro (Galeão International Airport)
Rochester, MN (Rochester International Airport) - mainline prop aircraft service until the mid 1960s
Sacramento (Sacramento International Airport)
St. Louis (Lambert-Saint Louis International Airport)
Salt Lake City (Salt Lake City International Airport)
San Antonio (San Antonio International Airport)
San Francisco (San Francisco International Airport)
São Paulo (Congonhas-São Paulo Airport)
Santiago (Comodoro Arturo Merino Benítez International Airport)
Seattle/Tacoma (Seattle-Tacoma International Airport)
Seoul (Gimpo International Airport)
 Shreveport (Shreveport Regional Airport)
 Sioux City, IA (Sioux Gateway Airport) - mainline prop aircraft and BAC One-Eleven jet service until the late 1960s
 Sioux Falls, SD (Sioux Falls Regional Airport) - mainline prop aircraft and BAC One-Eleven jet service until the late 1960s
Singapore (Singapore Changi Airport)
Tampa (Tampa International Airport)
Texarkana (Texarkana Regional Airport) - mainline prop aircraft service until the early 1960s
Toronto (Toronto Pearson International Airport)
Tucson (Tucson International Airport)
Tulsa (Tulsa International Airport)
 Waco (Waco Regional Airport) - mainline prop aircraft service until the early 1960s
Washington, D.C. 
(Washington Dulles International Airport)
(Washington National Airport)
Waterloo, IA (Waterloo Regional Airport) - mainline prop aircraft and BAC One-Eleven jet service until the late 1960s
West Palm Beach (Palm Beach International Airport)
Wichita (Wichita Mid-Continent Airport)
Wichita Falls (Wichita Falls Municipal Airport)

References

Braniff
Braniff Airways